The Death of Adolf Hitler: Unknown Documents from Soviet Archives is a 1968 book by Soviet journalist Lev Bezymenski, who served as an interpreter in the Battle of Berlin. The book gives details of the purported Soviet autopsies of Adolf Hitler, Eva Braun, Joseph and Magda Goebbels, their children, and General Hans Krebs. Each of these individuals are recorded as having been subjected to cyanide poisoning; contrary to the Western conclusion (and the accepted view of historians) that Hitler died by a suicide gunshot.

The book's release was preceded by various contradictory reports about Hitler's death, including from eyewitnesses. Under Joseph Stalin, the Soviets both claimed that Hitler died from cyanide and that he escaped Berlin. Much of the information presented in the book about how Hitler died (namely by poisoning or a coup de grâce) has been discredited, including by the author, as propaganda. Hitler's body was reputedly burned almost completely to ashes, meaning that there would be no corpse to conduct an autopsy upon. Only the Soviet description of Hitler's dental remains, consisting of a golden bridge and a mandibular fragment with teeth, is regarded as reliable; the book includes previously unreleased photographs of these.

Background

On 22 April 1945, as the Red Army was closing in on the  during the Battle of Berlin, Hitler declared that he would remain in Berlin until the end and then shoot himself. That same day, he asked  (SS) physician Werner Haase about the most reliable method of suicide; Haase suggested combining a dose of cyanide with a gunshot to the head. SS physician Ludwig Stumpfegger provided Hitler with some ampoules of prussic acid (hydrogen cyanide), which the dictator initially planned to use but later doubted their efficacy. On 29 April, Hitler ordered Haase to test one of the ampoules on his dog Blondi; the dog died instantly. On the afternoon of 30 April, Hitler committed suicide with Eva Braun in his bunker study. The former Reich minister of propaganda and Hitler's successor as chancellor of Germany, Joseph Goebbels, informed the  radio station, which broke the initial news of Hitler's death on the night of 1 May.

Bezymenski's 1968 book on Hitler's death was presaged by various contradictory reports regarding that event and its primary investigations.

Initial Soviet surveys
On 9 May 1945, The New York Times reported that a body was claimed by the Soviets to belong to Hitler, but that an anonymous servant disputed this—claiming that the body belonged to a cook who was killed because of his resemblance to the (allegedly escaped) dictator. By 11 May, two colleagues of Hitler's dentist, Hugo Blaschke, confirmed the dental remains of Hitler and Eva Braun; both subsequently spent years in Soviet prisons.

On 5 June, Soviet Marshal Georgy Zhukov's staff officers stated that Hitler's body had been examined and claimed that he had died by cyanide poisoning. At a press conference on 9 June, on orders from Soviet leader Joseph Stalin, Zhukov presented the official narrative that Hitler did not commit suicide, but had escaped Berlin—beginning a Soviet disinformation campaign suited to Stalin's desires. The next day, newspapers quoted Zhukov as saying, "We have found no corpse that could be Hitler's," and Soviet Colonel General Nikolai Berzarin as stating, "Perhaps he is in Spain with Franco." In early July, Time magazine cited the ongoing Soviet investigation as having produced no conclusive evidence and asserting that Hitler had ordered his men to spread news of his death.

When asked at the Potsdam Conference in July 1945 how Hitler had died, Stalin said he was either living "in Spain or Argentina." The same month, British newspapers quoted a Soviet officer as saying that a charred body they had discovered was "a very poor double." United States newspapers quoted the Russian garrison commandant of Berlin as claiming that Hitler had "gone into hiding somewhere in Europe," possibly with the help of Francoist Spain. In mid-1945, a Soviet major told American sources that Hitler had survived and claimed of the place in the Reich Chancellery garden where his body was said to have been burned, "It is not true that Hitler was found there!”. He went on to claim they did not find the body of Eva Braun, either.

According to SS valet Heinz Linge, who was captured by the Soviets in early May 1945, his interrogators repeatedly questioned him about whether Hitler was dead or if he could have escaped and perhaps left a double in his place; the Soviets told him that they had found a number of corpses but were unsure about Hitler's remains. In 1956, the German tabloid  quoted the Soviet People's Commissariat for Internal Affairs (NKVD) Captain Fjedor Pavlovich Vassilki as claiming, "Hitler's skull was [found] almost intact, as were the cranium and the upper and lower jaws."

Eyewitness accounts

Only three main eyewitnesses to the state of Hitler and Braun's bodies in the immediate aftermath of their deaths survived to provide their accounts: Linge,  Otto Günsche, and Hitler Youth leader Artur Axmann. Contrarily, in a purported Soviet transcript of a statement made on 17 May 1945 (and not released for six decades), Günsche allegedly first saw the bodies after they had been wrapped in blankets. British MI6 intelligence officer Hugh Trevor-Roper argued that discrepancies in truthful eyewitness accounts could be due to differences in "observation and recollection", while German historian Anton Joachimsthaler interpreted them as possibly being due to poor memory formation during the turbulent event. The three eyewitnesses to the immediate aftermath agree in their reports to Western authorities that Hitler was found seated upright at the end of the sofa (or in an armchair next to it) and Braun was next to him with no visible wounds.

After his capture in December 1945, Axmann told U.S. officials that he saw thin ribbons of blood coming from both of Hitler's temples and that his lower jaw seemed slightly askew, leading him to think that Hitler had shot himself through the mouth—with the temple blood a result of internal trauma.  Axmann did not check the back of the head for an exit wound. Axmann made other contradictory statements thereafter, such as reportedly being told Hitler used the pistol and poison method for suicide and that the shot in the mouth destroyed his dental work. In 1948, the Berlin Records Office cited Axmann's testimony from the Einsatzgruppen trial at Nuremberg that he had seen Hitler's body being carried in a blanket as insufficient evidence of the dictator's death; this led to an extensive investigation and for new testimony to be taken.

In 1956, Linge told U.S. officials that he saw a pfennig-sized wound on Hitler's right temple with a trail of blood running down to his cheek and a puddle on the floor; contrarily, he stated in 1965 that the entry wound was to the left temple, but he subsequently returned the wound being to the right temple and blood to the floor. Günsche told U.S. officials in 1956 that Hitler's right temple had a dark spot the size of a small coin, with a puddle of blood on the floor. The discrepancies between eyewitnesses spurred a criminological report for West Germany officials, which contrasted Axmann and Linge's description of the suicide aftermath against Günsche's, the latter claiming that Hitler was sitting in a chair next to the sofa. Hitler's death certificate was registered in 1956 as an assumption of death on the basis that no eyewitnesses had seen his body—which Joachimsthaler points out is false.

 Harry Mengershausen also made contradictory statements, initially claiming that Stumpfegger killed Hitler with a cyanide injection, but later claiming to have seen the temple entry wound.  (RSD) guard Hermann Karnau stated that before the cremation began Hitler's skull was "partially caved in and the face encrusted with blood". Günsche said that by this time "the bloodstains from the temple had spread further over the face". RSD guards Erich Mansfeld and Karnau testified that the remains were reduced to something between charred bones and piles of ashes which fell apart to the touch. Various witnesses and analyses agree that there was more than enough petrol to achieve extensive burning, although Trevor-Roper opines that the bones would not likely have completely disintegrated due to the burning taking place in open air. Hitler's chauffeur, Erich Kempka (who stated falsehoods and retracted many of his statements about the entire affair) stated in June 1945 about the cremations, "I doubt if anything remained of the bodies. The fire was terrifically intense. Maybe some evidence like bits of bone and teeth could be found but the artillery shelling "scattered things all over." Until 1968, Western historians referred to Hitler's mandibular remains without mentioning their fragmentary nature.

Further findings 
In 1946, the successor to the NKVD, the Ministry of Internal Affairs, conducted a second investigation (known as "Operation Myth"). Blood from Hitler's sofa and wall was reportedly matched to his blood type and a partially burnt skull fragment was found with gun damage to the posterior of the parietal bone. These two discoveries led to the Soviet admission that Hitler died by gunshot, as opposed to cyanide poisoning (as claimed by the purported autopsy report published in Bezymenski's book).

In 1963, author Cornelius Ryan interviewed General B. S. Telpuchovski, a Soviet historian who was allegedly present during the aftermath of the Battle of Berlin. Telpuchovski claimed that on 2 May 1945, a burnt body he thought belonged to Hitler was found wrapped in a blanket. This supposed individual had been killed by a gunshot through the mouth, with an exit wound through the back of the head. Several dental bridges were purportedly found next to the body, because, Telpuchovski stated, "the force of the bullet had dislodged them from the mouth". In his 1966 book, The Last Battle, Ryan describes this body as being Hitler's, saying it had been buried "under a thin layer of earth". According to Telpuchovski, a total of three burnt Hitler candidates had been produced, apparently including a body double wearing mended socks, as well as an unburnt body.

Author
Soviet journalist Lev Bezymenski (1920–2007), the son of poet Aleksandr Bezymensky, served as an interpreter in the Battle of Berlin under Marshal Zhukov. Early on 1 May 1945, he translated a letter from Goebbels and Bormann announcing Hitler's death. Bezymenski authored several works about the Nazi era.

Content

The book begins with an overview of the Battle of Berlin and its aftermath, including a reproduction of the purported Soviet autopsy report of Hitler's body. Bezymenski states that the bodies of Hitler and Braun were "the most seriously disfigured of all thirteen corpses" examined. The appendix summarizes the discovery of the Goebbels family's corpses and includes further forensic reports. On why the autopsy reports were not released earlier, Bezymenski says:Not because of doubts as to the credibility of the experts. ... Those who were involved in the investigation remember that other considerations played a far larger role. First, it was resolved not to publish the results of the forensic-medical report but to "hold it in reserve" in case someone might try to slip into the role of "the Führer saved by a miracle." Secondly, it was resolved to continue the investigations in order to exclude any possibility of error or deliberate deception.

The Death of Adolf Hitler

Early in the book, Bezymenski contends that accounts written by those who lacked access to the autopsy reports "have confused the issue rather than clarifying it." He cites The Rise and Fall of the Third Reich (1960), in which William L. Shirer states:

The bones were never found, and this gave rise to rumors after the war that Hitler had survived. But the separate interrogation of several eyewitnesses by British and American intelligence officers leaves no doubt about the matter. Kempka has given a plausible explanation as to why the charred remains were never found. "The traces were wiped out," he told his interrogators, "by the uninterrupted Russian artillery fire."

Bezymenski goes on to cite Hitler: A Study in Tyranny (1962 edition), in which Alan Bullock says:

What happened to the ashes of the two burned bodies left in the Chancellery Garden has never been discovered. ... Trevor-Roper, who carried out a thorough investigation in 1945 of the circumstances surrounding Hitler's death, inclines to the view that the ashes were collected into a box and handed to Artur Axmann. ... It is, of course, true that no final incontrovertible evidence in the form of Hitler's dead body has been produced.

Bezymenski then gives an account of the battle of Berlin, the subsequent investigation by SMERSH, supplemented by later statements of Nazi officers. Klimenko noted that the corpse had mended socks, initially giving him doubt as well. Klimenko then relates that on 4 May, Soviet Private Ivan Churakov found legs sticking out of the ground in a crater outside the Reich Chancellery. Two corpses were exhumed, but Klimenko had these reburied, thinking that the doppelgänger would be identified as Hitler. Only that day did several witnesses say it was definitely not Hitler's body, and a diplomat released it for burial. On the morning of 5 May, Klimenko had the other two bodies reexhumed. By 11 May, two colleagues of Hitler's dentist both confirmed the dental remains of Hitler and Eva Braun. On 13 May, SMERSH produced a report of the initial disposal of the corpses based on the testimony of an SS guard.

A report on the purported forensic examination of Hitler's body conducted on 8 May states that the "remains of a male corpse disfigured by fire were delivered in a wooden box ... On the body was found a piece of yellow jersey ... charred around the edges, resembling a knitted undervest." Part of the skull was missing, as was the left foot and the left testicle.
The upper dental remains consisted of nine upper teeth, mostly gold, with dental work connected by a gold bridge. The lower jawbone fragment had 15 teeth, 10 of them apparently artificial; it was found loose in the oral cavity, and was broken and burnt around the alveolar process, the bulge that encases the tooth sockets. Splinters of glass and a "thin-walled ampule" were found in the mouth, apparently from a cyanide capsule, which was ruled to be the cause of death.
Soviet physician Faust Shkaravsky, who oversaw the alleged autopsy, declared that "No matter what is asserted ... our Commission could not detect any traces of a gun shot ... Hitler poisoned himself."

Bezymenski also criticizes discrepancies of prior reports. Günsche allegedly told the Soviets in 1950 that both Hitler and Braun were seated on the sofa, but in 1960, said both were on chairs. Bezymenski points out that Linge's 1965 claim of Hitler's entry wound being to the left temple is unlikely as Hitler was right-handed and his left hand trembled significantly.

Bezymenski quotes testimony given to the Soviets by SS general Johann Rattenhuber, in which he claimed that before killing himself with cyanide, Hitler ordered Linge to return in ten minutes to deliver a coup de grâce-style gunshot to ensure his death. Bezymenski calls it "certain" that if anyone shot Hitler, it was not himself. To support this claim, he cites the little black dog found nearby, which was killed in a similar fashion. The author also refers to a skull fragment recovered in 1946, which had a gunshot wound to the back of the head, saying it most likely belonged to Hitler.

Bezymenski asserts that sometime after the forensic examinations, the corpses of Hitler and the others were completely burned and the ashes scattered.

Appendix
The appendix includes the purported Soviet forensic reports on the bodies of Braun, the Goebbels family, General Krebs, and two dogs.

Eva Braun
The purported autopsy of the body presumed to be Braun's was conducted on 8 May 1945. The corpse is noted as being "impossible to describe the features of", owing to its extensive charring. Almost the entire upper skull was missing. The occipital and temporal bones were fragmentary, as was the lower left of the face. The upper jaw contained four teeth, while the lower jaw had six teeth on the left; the others were missing—according to the report "probably because of burning". The alveolar process of the maxilla was also absent. A piece of gold (probably a filling) was found in the mouth cavity, and a gold bridge with two false molars was under the tongue. There was a splinter injury to the chest resulting in hemothorax, injuries to one lung and the pericardium—accompanied by six small metal fragments. Pieces of a glass ampule were found in the mouth, and the smell of bitter almonds which accompanies death from cyanide poisoning was present; this was ruled to be the cause of death.

Goebbels family

The partly burnt body of Joseph Goebbels and the remains presumed to be Magda Goebbels were discovered near the bunker emergency exit by Ivan Klimenko on 2 May 1945, reportedly after a German notified him of their presence. The next day, Senior Lieutenant Ilyin found the bodies of the Goebbels children in one of the rooms of the Chancellery bunker. The bodies were identified by Vizeadmiral Voss, cook Lange, and Karl Schneider (referred to as the head garage mechanic), "all of whom knew [the Goebbels family] well." The autopsies of two of the children are listed as taking place on 7 and 8 May; all six children were determined to have died from cyanide poisoning. Autopsies for Joseph, Magda and General Krebs were conducted on 9 May.

Joseph Goebbels's body was "heavily scorched", but was identified by his size, estimated age, shortened right leg and related orthopedic appliance, as well as his head characteristics and dental remains, which included many fillings. His genitals were "greatly reduced in size, shrunken, dry." Chemical testing revealed cyanide compounds in the internal organs and blood; cyanide poisoning was judged to be the cause of death.

The body presumed to be Magda's was scorched beyond recognition. Voss identified two items found on the corpse as having been in her possession: a cigarette case inscribed "Adolf Hitler—29.X.34", which she had used for the last three weeks of her life, and Hitler's Golden Party Badge, which the dictator had given her three days before his suicide. Additionally, a reddish-blond hairpiece was identified as matching the color of one Magda wore. Her dental remains, including both a maxilla and mandible with dental work, were found loose on the corpse along with splinters from a thin-walled ampule; the cause of death was ruled to be cyanide poisoning.

General Krebs
General Krebs is erroneously listed in the autopsy report as "Major General Krips" (as Bezymenski notes). Cyanide compounds were detected in the internal organs and the smell of bitter almonds was recorded, leading the commission to conclude that Krebs' death was "obviously caused by poisoning with cyanide compounds." Three light head wounds were presumed to have been obtained from his death fall onto a protruding object.

Dogs
A German Shepherd matching Hitler's dog Blondi's description appears to have died from cyanide poisoning. A small black bitch, about 60 centimetres (2 ft) long and 28 cm (1 ft) tall, was poisoned by cyanide before being shot in the head.

Photographs
Sixteen pages of previously unreleased photographs include those of Ivan Klimenko, head of autopsy commission Faust Shkaravsky, the locations of Hitler's burning and burying site outside the 's emergency exit, SMERSH agents exhuming Hitler and Braun's remains, a diagram of where the corpses of Hitler, Braun, Joseph and Magda Goebbels were burned, Hitler and Braun's alleged corpses in boxes (angled so that unidentifiable mounds of flesh can be seen), front and back views of Hitler's golden upper dental bridge and a lower jawbone fragment connecting his lower teeth and bridges, a sketch drawn by Hitler's dentist's assistant Käthe Heusermann on 11 May 1945 to identify Hitler's dental remains, Braun's dental bridge, the first and last page of Hitler's autopsy report, the Soviet autopsy commission with both Kreb's and Joseph Goebbels' corpses, the bodies of the Goebbels family, the bodies of Krebs and the Goebbels children at Plötzensee Prison, and Blondi's corpse.

Criticism and legacy
Upon the book's publication, Hugh Trevor-Roper wrote that it was "remarkable that [Bezymenski's] book is apparently for Western consumption only", with no Russian release and the book's original language apparently being German. Trevor-Roper says, "No explanation is offered of these interesting facts, which suggest a propagandist rather than an historical purpose." A paperback edition was published in English in 1969, claiming on the cover to "prove how Hitler died ... for the first time". In his 1971 book about Hitler, German historian Werner Maser expresses doubt about Bezymenski's book, including the autopsy's insinuation that Hitler had only one testicle.

Soviet war interpreter Elena Rzhevskaya claimed to have seen Hitler's charred corpse in the Chancellery garden. According to her, the dental remains were removed during the alleged autopsy (at which Bezymenski asserts she was not present), and the pages of the report about them were recorded on "two large non-standard sheets of paper". Rzhevskaya safeguarded the dental remains until they could be identified by Hitler's dental staff. Shkaravsky (d. 1975) wrote to her that the commission had been forbidden to photograph Hitler's body for unknown reasons and suggested that the damage to Braun's chest could have been from shrapnel. According to Lindloff, who cremated Hitler and Braun's bodies, after only 30 minutes the bodies were "already charred and torn open", in part caused by shrapnel.

In 1978, Jove Books published an English-language mass-market paperback, which incorporates an Operation Cornflakes stamp on the cover. In his book The Bunker (1978), journalist James P. O'Donnell quotes Bezymenski's citation of a Soviet forensic scientist who asserted that cyanide acts instantly, implying that Hitler could not have taken poison then shot himself. O'Donnell calls this assertion false, arguing that that Hitler could have used this method. O'Donnell also dismisses the claim that Hitler would not have been able to pull the trigger due to his hand tremors, because only the dictator's left hand was notably afflicted.

In 1982, a second edition of the book was released in German. It includes the odontological report by Sognnaes and Strøm. Additionally, Bezymenski attempts to account for the failure to produce evidence of Hitler's death by gunshot. He also expounds on Mengershausen's claims, saying that he was extensively interrogated by the Soviets as a key witness, in June 1945 providing the exact locations where he supposedly buried Hitler and Braun. In 1992, Bezymenski wrote that Hitler's corpse was cremated in April 1978, contrary to his assertion in the book's first edition that it had been done by 1968. According to a 1992  article, Bezymenski learned that year that the cremation took place in 1970. Bezymenski, who described himself as having been "a product of the era and a typical party propagandist", stated that "It is not difficult to guess why the KGB had not given me a document with [findings suggesting Hitler's slow death], me who was supposed to lead the reader to the conclusion that all talk of a gunshot was a pipe dream or half an invention and that Hitler actually poisoned himself."
In a 2003 episode of National Geographic's Riddles of the Dead, Bezymenski elaborates that the KGB only granted him access to the documents in the Soviet archive on the basis that he would maintain the narrative that Hitler died by cyanide and say his remains had been cremated by June 1945.

In 1995, journalist Ada Petrova and historian Peter Watson wrote that they considered Bezymenski's account at odds with Trevor-Roper's report, published as The Last Days of Hitler (1947). Though Petrova and Watson used Bezymenski's book as a source for theirs, they note issues with the SMERSH investigation. A main issue they cite is that the autopsies on the alleged remains of Hitler and Braun did not include a record of dissection of their internal organs, which would have shown with certainty whether poison was a factor in their deaths. They also opine that it was dissatisfaction of this first investigation, along with concerns of the findings of Trevor-Roper, that led to Stalin ordering a second commission in 1946. Petrova and Watson also cite Hitler's alleged autopsy report to refute Hugh Thomas's theory that only Hitler's dental remains belonged to him, saying that the entire jawbone structure would have had to have been found loose on the alleged body while clamping down on the tongue, which "would presumably be a very difficult arrangement to fake".

In 1995, Anton Joachimsthaler criticized Bezymenski's account in his book on Hitler's death, reaching the same conclusion put forward 45 years earlier by U.S. jurist Michael Musmanno (presiding judge at the Einsatzgruppen trial) that the dictator's corpse was almost completely burned to ashes—meaning that no body would have remained to perform an autopsy on. Joachimsthaler implies that another body must have been examined instead, while also pointing out that hydrogen cyanide would have been evaporated by the fire and thus not left an odor. He quotes German pathologist  as saying about the alleged autopsy: "Bezemensky's report is ridiculous. ... Any one of my assistants would have done better ... the whole thing is a farce ... it is intolerably bad work ... the transcript of the post-mortem section of 8 [May] 1945 describes anything but Hitler." Similarly, historian Luke Daly-Groves states that "the Soviet soldiers picked up whatever mush they could find in front of Hitler's bunker exit, put it in a box and claimed it was the corpses of Adolf and Eva Hitler", and also denounces "the dubious autopsy report riddled with scientific inconsistencies and tainted by ideological motivations". Only the report's coverage of the dental remains has been substantially verified, with 2017–2018 analysis led by French forensic pathologist Philippe Charlier concluding that the extant evidence "[fits] perfectly" with the Soviet description. Contradicting previous accounts of the finding of the dental remains, Joachimsthaler asserts that the Soviets sifted them from the dirt in the manner Heimlich claimed without evidence that the Americans searched the garden in December 1945, implying that Heimlich learned of this method from a Soviet officer and incorporated it into his account.

In their addendum to The Hitler Book (2005), Henrik Eberle and Matthias Uhl quote Bezymenski as admitting in 1995 that his work included "deliberate lies" and criticize his book for advocating the theories that Hitler died by poisoning or a coup de grâce. Despite this, in 2018, investigative journalists Jean-Christophe Brisard and Lana Parshina asserted that Hitler could have commissioned Linge to shoot him through the temples because the dictator's poor health—particularly his hand tremors—would have made it difficult for him to do. However, Brisard and Parshina also dismiss Bezymenski's book as largely propagandistic.

See also
Unity Mitford

References

Footnotes

Citations

Sources

Further reading

1945 documents
1968 non-fiction books
Books about Adolf Hitler
Death of Adolf Hitler
German-language books
German non-fiction books
Germany–Soviet Union relations
Soviet propaganda books